The Men's team sprint at the 2011 UCI Para-cycling Track World Championships was held on March 13.

15 nations of 3 cyclists each participated in the contest. After the qualifying, the fastest 2 teams raced for gold, and 3rd and 4th teams raced for bronze.

Results

Qualifying

Finals

References

Sprint